Oqoltin is a district of Sirdaryo Region in Uzbekistan. The capital lies at the town Sardoba. The district consists of 3 urban-type settlements (Sardoba, Fargʻona, Andijon) and 3 rural communities.

References

Districts of Uzbekistan
Sirdaryo Region